State Route 140 (SR 140) is a state highway in the U.S. state of California, 102 miles (164 km) in length. It begins in the San Joaquin Valley at Interstate 5 near Gustine, and runs east into Sierra Nevada, terminating in Yosemite National Park.

Route description

Heading east from I-5, the highway passes Gustine; it then jogs to cross the San Joaquin River. It roughly marks the southern edge of the farmable land around Livingston. It intersects with State Route 99 in Merced, which it overlaps for a few miles. Travelers coming from most regions of the San Francisco Bay Area or other parts of Northern California to Yosemite Valley and the southern portion of Yosemite would transfer from Highway 99 to Highway 140 at this point. For those coming from San Jose and the rest of the Silicon Valley, the most direct, fastest route is State Route 152 east; then the roads of Road 9, Bliss Road, Sandy Mush Road, and Plainsburg Road to reach Highway 140 in Planada. (Those going to the northern portion of Yosemite would have instead taken either I-580 and I-205 leaving the Bay Area, then State Route 120 east through Manteca, or State Route 132 east through Modesto.)

After exiting Highway 99, Highway 140 continues through Planada, after which the farmland gives way to grazing land. It is quite dry in the summer due to California's Mediterranean climate, and the dry grass gives the landscape a golden color. Western meadowlarks, American kestrels, red-tailed hawks and turkey vultures are frequently glimpsed. A few blue oaks can be seen as the highway leaves the valley and begins to climb through the foothills of the Sierra Nevada. They become more and more numerous as the elevation increases. As the highway passes through Catheys Valley the vegetation begins to diversify a little. California live oaks and ponderosa pines intermingle with the blue oaks as it nears Mariposa. In Mariposa, it briefly runs concurrently with State Route 49.

A ponderosa pine forest borders the highway on both sides as it passes through Midpines. As it approaches Briceburg, the roadway follows a steep, winding grade down to the Merced River valley. The upper stretch of the Merced River valley below the park, which the highway follows, is designated as Wild and Scenic River Area. The area separates Sierra National Forest (south) and Stanislaus National Forest (north).

Inside Yosemite, state routes are federally maintained and are not included in the state route logs. The highway continues into the park as El Portal Drive, following the Merced River to Yosemite Valley. The road intersects with Big Oak Flat Road, providing a connection to State Route 120. El Portal Drive then splits into a one way loop road to connect the rest of the valley, heading east as Southside Drive on the south side of the river and then looping back west as Northside Drive on the north side of the river. State Route 41/Wawona Road intersects with Southside Drive just east of the split.

SR 140 is part of the California Freeway and Expressway System, and is part of the National Highway System, a network of highways that are considered essential to the country's economy, defense, and mobility by the Federal Highway Administration. SR 140 is eligible to be included in the State Scenic Highway System; however, only the part of the road from Mariposa to El Portal is designated as a scenic highway.

History
The "All-Weather Highway" (now State Route 140) opened in 1926, ensuring year-long visitation and delivery of supplies under normal conditions.[74]  NPS 1989, p. 113.
In June 2006, the road between El Portal and Mariposa was closed due to a rock slide.

A small detour opened in August, 2006, with a traffic light system to allow drivers to circumvent the original slide damage area.
Plans are underway for construction of a rock shed through the slide area to restore the original alignment.

The road was closed in 2018 due to the Ferguson Fire.

Major intersections

See also

References

External links

Caltrans Route 140 Photos
California Highways—State Route 140
California @ AARoads.com - State Route 140
Caltrans: Route 140 highway conditions
Acrobat US Forest Service file containing a map of the slide, (June 2006).
Current Conditions - Ferguson Rock Slide, Chronology of Events

140
State Route 140
140
State Route 140
Merced, California